The Technology Incubation Scheme (TIS) was a government funding program of the National Research Foundation (NRF) of Singapore. The scheme was started in 2009 and ended on 30 June 2016.

Details of the Program 
The TIS program selected funds that matched the following criteria:
 Funds that can incubate and nurture young start-ups prior to venture capital funding.
 The program matches investments up-to 85% co-funding of a private incubator (maximum S$500,000).
 Incubators have the option to buy out NRF's equity of the company. Option is valid for 3 years (post TIS investment).

Incubators accepted into the Program 
As of 1 August 2013, there are currently 14 approved funds to work with the Singapore Government as part of the program:
 The Biofactory
 Clearbridge Accelerator
 Get2Volume
 Golden Gate Ventures
 Incuvest
 Jungle Ventures
 Plug&Play Singapore
 Red Dot Ventures
 Small World Group
 Stream Global
 Silicon Straits
 TechCube8
 TNF Ventures
 Wavemakers Labs

Funded under Technology Incubation Scheme 
 Rainmaker Labs - Singapore Mobile App Development Company

References

External links
 SG Entrepreneur's article on incubators in Singapore’s Technology Incubation Scheme

2009 establishments in Singapore
2016 disestablishments in Singapore
Science and technology in Singapore